Alexander Biemeret (February 28, 1877 – May 29, 1946) was an American politician who served as the 37th mayor of Green Bay, Wisconsin, from 1939 to 1945.

Biography
Biemeret was born on February 28, 1877. He died from myocardial infarction on May 29, 1946.

Career
Prior to his time as mayor, Biemeret served as a Green Bay alderman and city councilman. He served as mayor from 1938 to 1945.

References

Wisconsin city council members
Mayors of Green Bay, Wisconsin
1877 births
1946 deaths